Kimmerosaurus ("lizard from Kimmeridge") is an extinct genus of plesiosaur from the family Cryptoclididae. Kimmerosaurus is most closely related to Tatenectes.

Discovery

There are very few fossil remains of Kimmerosaurus known. In fact, nothing has been found to show what Kimmerosaurus may have looked like below the neck, although the atlas and the axis are similar to those of the plesiosaur Colymbosaurus. It is this lack of any post-cranial fossils, and the bone similarities that has led to the belief that Kimmerosaurus fossils could be the missing head of Colymbosaurus, a  similar plesiosaur with no known skull fossils.

The first part of the genus name of Kimmerosaurus comes from the location of the first Kimmerosaurus fossils, Kimmeridge Clay deposits of Dorset, England (these deposits are also the root word for the Kimmeridgian stage of the Jurassic period). The second part comes from the Greek word , "lizard".

Description
As Kimmerosaurus is known from only a skull (and a few cervical vertebrae), much of the plesiosaur's description comes from its teeth, which are recurved and buccolingually compressed (compressed cheek-side to tongue-side). The premaxilla has only eight teeth, while there are thirty-six teeth on each ramus. The parietals of Kimmerosaurus do not form a sagittal crest. The overall skull of Kimmerosaurus is similar to Cryptoclidus but much more broad.

Palaeoecology
Kimmerosaurus fossils are found in the Kimmeridge Clay Formation near the town of Kimmeridge, in Dorset, England. This animal may have ranged through much of what is now the Jurassic Coast, a World Heritage Site in the southern United Kingdom.

See also

 List of plesiosaur genera
 Timeline of plesiosaur research

References

External links
Entry on Kimmerosaurus at The Plesiosaur Site
Palaeos Vertebrates entry

Late Jurassic plesiosaurs of Europe
Cryptoclidids
Fossil taxa described in 1981
Sauropterygian genera